Baresa is a small town in the Northern Red Sea region of Eritrea. It lies between Asmara and Massawa, near Ghinda.

Transport
Baresa is served by a station on the national Eritrean Railway network.

See also
Railway stations in Eritrea

References
Baresa

Populated places in Eritrea